"Fake It" is a song by English indie pop band Bastille. Despite being released before their second studio album Wild World, it is not a single, as confirmed by lead singer Dan Smith on Twitter.

Video
An official video was released August 19, 2016 to promote the song.

Personnel
Dan Smith – lead vocals, keyboards, piano, percussion, string arrangements, production, programming
Kyle Simmons – keyboards, percussion, backing vocals
Will Farquarson – bass, keyboards, acoustic guitar, electric guitar, backing vocals
David Kendrick – drums, percussion, backing vocals
Charlie Barnes – Guitar, keyboard, additional drums

Charts

References

2016 songs
Bastille (band) songs
Songs written by Dan Smith (singer)